George William Kelsey  (August 24, 1881 – April 24, 1968), was a professional baseball player for the 1907 Pittsburgh Pirates. He later was a manager in the Texas League in 1909 and the Western Association in 1915.

External links

1881 births
1968 deaths
Pittsburgh Pirates players
Major League Baseball catchers
Baseball players from Ohio
Minor league baseball managers
Bellingham Gillnetters players
St. Paul Saints (AA) players
Waterloo Microbes players
Temple Boll Weevils players
Coffeyville Glassblowers players
Oklahoma City Mets players
Oklahoma City Indians players
Houston Buffaloes players
People from Covington, Ohio